UFTM may refer to:

 Ulster Folk and Transport Museum, in Cultra, Northern Ireland
 Universidade Federal do Triângulo Mineiro, the Federal University of Triângulo Mineiro, a public university in Uberaba, Minas Gerais, Brazil

See also 
 Union for the Mediterranean (UfM), an intergovernmental organization.